The KJC King Dome is a multipurpose indoor arena currently under construction in Davao City, Philippines.

History

Construction
The construction of the KJC King Dome is being managed by the ACQ Solomonic Builders Development Corporation, a subsidiary of the Christian church, Kingdom of Jesus Christ (KJC). The groundbreaking ceremony of the facility being built beside the Francisco Bangoy International Airport complex. was commenced on September 3, 2012 and is expected to be completed in September 2023, in commemoration of the 38th Anniversary of KJC.

In January 2018, Zhejiang-based Chinese sports firm Dafeng formally entered in a partnership with KJC in a signing ceremony in Hangzhou. The project has been included in the One Belt One Road Initiative by the Chinese Ministry of Culture.

The construction was delayed due to difficulty in shipping in materials from Vietnam and China but the structure is already 60 to 70 percent complete as of November 2019. Initially projected to cost , the construction cost for the KJC King Dome increased to  due to delays.

Use and facilities
Originally planned solely as a cathedral for the Kingdom of Jesus Christ (KJC) of Pastor Apollo Quiboloy, the KJC King Dome will be also used for other events such as concerts, boxing events and basketball games. The facility will host a cube scoreboard.

The King Dome will be part of the Kingdom Global City Commercial Complex, a mixed-used development registered as a Tourism Enterprise Zone (TEZ). The complex will house a condominium, a hotel, a museum, a hangar, a water park, a commercial center, and an administration complex.

The King Dome itself will be bigger than the 55,000-capacity Philippine Arena, with the King Dome having a capacity of 75,000, making it the largest indoor arena in the world. Initially it was planned that the seating capacity of the King Dome was to be 50,000.

Architecture and design
An Australian architect firm is reportedly behind the design of the KJC King Dome while Manuel de Luna claims to be the principal architect of the KJC Dome.The design has been compared to the Staples Center by KJC leader Apollo Quiboloy, with one level of the multi-level King Dome excavated down due to its proximity to Davao City's international airport. It will also have 38 elevators and an airconditioning system. A rectractable roof was proposed for the indoor arena but this suggestion was declined.

Dafeng, a firm involved in the project will provide the lighting, seating, curtain wall, and stage machinery of the indoor arena. The KJC Kingdome will have a double-curved glass curtain wall, a cellular aluminum panel system, and flood lighting. Its facade will look like a crown. The structure has six layers of insulation and waterproofing.

References

Proposed indoor arenas
Buildings and structures in Davao City
Churches in the Philippines
Indoor arenas in the Philippines
Basketball venues in the Philippines
Indoor arenas under construction
Buildings and structures under construction in the Philippines